William Pringle may refer to:

 William Pringle (cricketer) (1881-1966), South African cricketer
 William Pringle (Liberal MP) (1874–1928), British Liberal Party politician, Member of Parliament for Penistone 1922–1924
 William Henderson Pringle (1877–1967), Scottish Liberal Party politician, Candidate at Berwick & Haddington and Ayr Burghs
 Sir William Henry Pringle (c. 1771–1840), British Member of Parliament 1812–1832
 William Pringle (footballer) (1932–2006), English footballer